Artemisa Province is one of the two new provinces created from the former La Habana Province, whose creation was approved by the Cuban National Assembly on August 1, 2010, the other being Mayabeque Province. The new provinces came into existence on January 1, 2011.

Overview
Artemisa was the largest city and municipality of the former La Habana Province. The newly formed province combined the eight western municipalities of La Habana Province and three eastern municipalities of neighbor province Pinar del Río (Bahía Honda, Candelaria and San Cristóbal). The capital and largest city is Artemisa (47,000 pop. in 2015).

The new province is only larger than Havana city and Mayabeque, but with more population than four other Cuban provinces. It is the most densely populated, after Havana city and Santiago de Cuba.

The economy of the Artemisa province is based mainly on agriculture (fruits, potatoes, rice, vegetables, sugar cane) and industry of building materials (two cement factories), food processing industry and power plants. It contains the important port of Mariel in the northern coast. The province is also important in the military sector with the main Cuban Air Force base (San Antonio de los Baños) the Western base of the Cuban Navy (Cabañas Bay) and the Military Academy (College) "Antonio Maceo" in Caimito.

Municipalities

Source: Oficina Nacional de Estadísticas 2010

Topography
The maximum elevation in the province is Guajaibon peak (700 meters), and is located near N 22 47' 19" W 83 21' 52" in Sierra del Rosario range.

See also 
Soroa
Las Terrazas
Guaniguanico
Sierra del Rosario

References

External links 
 

 
Provinces of Cuba
La Habana Province
 States and territories established in 2011